Saelices is a municipality located in the province of Cuenca, Castile-La Mancha, Spain. According to the 2004 census (INE), the municipality has a population of 649 inhabitants.

Segobriga, the remains of a Roman city, is 6 km south of Saelices.

References